Deh-e Alireza (also Romanized as Deh-e ʿAlīrez̤ā) is a village in Howmeh Rural District, in the Central District of Haftgel County, Khuzestan Province, Iran. At the 2006 census, its population was 142, in 25 families.

References 

Populated places in Haftkel County